Typhonium peltandroides is a species of plant in the arum family that is endemic to Australia.

Etymology
The specific epithet peltandroides alludes to the similarity of the leaf venation to that of the American aroid genus Peltandra.

Description
The species is a deciduous geophytic, perennial herb, which resprouts annually from a hemispherical corm about 5 cm in diameter. The oval leaves are 14–34 cm long by 7–11.7 cm wide, on a 15–50 cm long stalk. The flower is enclosed in a spathe, green on the outside, deep reddish-purple on the inside, appearing in late December and January. Fruiting occurs from mid-January to March.

Distribution and habitat
The species is known only from the tropical Northern Kimberley IBRA bioregion of north-west Western Australia, where the type specimen was collected from Grevillea Gorge in the Synnott Range. There it grows in shallow sandy soil on a sandstone substrate, in rainforest thickets or with Triodia grasses on rock ledges along the sides of the gorge.

References

 
peltandroides
Monocots of Australia
Flora of Western Australia
Taxa named by Alistair Hay
Taxa named by Matthew David Barrett
Taxa named by Russell Lindsay Barrett
Plants described in 1999